Rajkot Municipal Corporation  is responsible for the civic infrastructure and administration of the city of Rajkot in Gujarat state of India. The organization is known, in short, as RMC. It was established in 1973. This civic administrative body administers an area of 104.86 km2. RMC is headed by  Mayor of Rajkot.

The governing structure of RMC consists of political and administrative wings. The political wing is an elected body of councilors headed by a mayor. The municipal commissioner from the IAS cadre heads the administrative wing and is responsible for strategic and operational planning and management of the corporation.  The commissioner takes decisions on behalf of the board or the standing committee formed from the elected councilors to perform the duties of the corporation.

Services 
The RMC is responsible for administering and providing basic infrastructure to the city.

 City bus service - BRTS & RMTS
 Water Purification and Supply
 Sewage treatment and Disposal
 Garbage disposal and Street Cleanliness
 Solid Waste Management
 Disaster Management
 Building and Maintenance of Roads, Streets and Flyovers.
 Street Lighting
 Maintenance of Parks, Gardens and Open Plots (Spaces)
 Cemeteries and Crematoriums
 Registering of Births and Deaths
 Conservation of Heritage Sites
 Disease control, including Immunization
 Maintaining (Public) Municipal managed schools.

City Civic Center 
Rajkot Municipal Corporation has started City Civic Center in different areas of city to get maximum advantage of the technology and give transparency in the day-to-day administration. RMC has five City Civic Centers, operational in different areas of Rajkot Municipal Corporation for benefits of citizens of Rajkot. Now any citizen can access municipal corporation’s services within 3 km from his/her residence. All city civic centers are connected with one other by online networking facility. City civic center provides facilities like: Property Tax Assessment and Collection, Water Charges Assessment and Collection, New water connection, Complaint Redressal, Shop and Establishment, Birth's and Death's certificates, Building plans' permissions and various tax collection.

 Amin Marg City Civic Center
 Krishna Nagar City Civic Center
 East Zone City Civic Center
 Central Office City Civic Center
 West Zone City Civic Center
 Kothariya Road City Civic Center

Administrative purposes the city is divided into 3 zones - Central, East and West. The city is further divided in 18 wards.

The Corporation is headed by a Municipal Commissioner, an IAS officer appointed by the government of Gujarat. He wields the executive power of the house. Each ward is represented by 4 corporators. An election is held to elect corporators to power. The mayor heads the party with the largest number of corporators elected. The mayor is responsible for the day-to-day running of the city services.

Initiatives

Environment Safety Initiative 
 In 2018, RMC banned plastic pouches in Rajkot in order to save the environment.

Rajkot Marathon 2017 
Rajkot Municipal Corporation had organized Marathon on 5 February 2017 (Sunday). There were six different routes offered to the runners: 
 Full Marathon (42.195 km)
 Half Marathon (21.097 km)
 Dream Run (10.00 km)
 Rangeela Rajkot Run (5.00 km)
 Senior Citizen Run (2.50 km)
 Special Run - For differently-abled people (1.00 km)

Cheteshwar Pujara, Indian Cricketer was the brand ambassador of that marathon. The objective of the marathon was to spread awareness about smart city under the slogan of "Run for Smart Rajkot" 
There were 63595 runners participated in various offered marathon routes. It became the second largest marathon of the world and the largest marathon of Asia with such huge participation.

Reception

Awards and recognition 
 In 2015, Quality Council of India, New Delhi felicitated Rajkot Municipal Corporation with Effective Management of Malnutrition in Slum Children Award
 In 2015, Nation Accreditation Board For Hospitals & Healthcare Providers (Constituent Board of Quality Council of India.) felicitated Rajkot Municipal Corporation with Nabh Accreditation Award (Nabh Accreditation To Nana Mawa Health Center 1st Urban Health Center of India To Get Such Accreditation.) 
 In 2015, Government Of Gujarat felicitated Rajkot Municipal Corporation with 'Kayakalp Award' For Best Practice In Healthcare Felicitated By Hon. Chief Minister Shri Anandiben Patel
 In 2016, Quality Council of India, New Delhi felicitated Rajkot Municipal Corporation with National Award For Implementation of Food Safety Act-2016

Guinness World Records 
 In 2017, Rajkot Municipal Corporation has become the Guinness World Record holder for "Largest House Cleaning Lesson" in which there were 1890 people from the various areas of Rajkot participated in performed the same as demonstrated by the trainer. This lesson lasted for more than 50 minutes. The participants were taught and trained about cleaning kitchen, bedroom, bathroom, living room and floor along with tips for segregation of waste at source. Further, every participant was gifted the kit containing two dustbins, a mop,  a broom and a duster. This record attempt was made on 28 May 2017 at Rajkot. Official Link of Guinness World Records page.

References

External links 
 Official website

Municipal corporations in India
Municipal corporations in Gujarat
1973 establishments in Gujarat